Conrad Stephen Susa (April 26, 1935 – November 21, 2013) was an American composer.  Born in Springdale, Pennsylvania, Susa studied at the Carnegie Institute of Technology and the Juilliard School, where his teachers included William Bergsma, Vincent Persichetti and, by his own claim, P. D. Q. Bach, the fictitious spoof character created by American composer Peter Schickele.

From 1959 to 1994, Susa was composer-in-residence for the Old Globe Theater (San Diego, California), where he wrote incidental music for over 200 productions there.  In 1988, he joined the faculty of the San Francisco Conservatory of Music, and remained there as a professor of composition until his death.

Susa became particularly known for his 5 operas. His 1973 chamber opera, Transformations, set to texts from the poems of Anne Sexton, is one of the most frequently performed operas by an American composer. His other compositions include choral works and incidental music for various plays. His music is published by the E.C. Schirmer Music Company.

Selected works 
Operas
Transformations (1973)
Black River (1975, revised 1981)
The Love of Don Perlimplin (1984)
The Wise Women (1994)
The Dangerous Liaisons (1994, revised 1996-97)

Other works
Hymns for the Amusement of Children (1972)
Carols and Lullabies: Christmas in the Southwest (1992)

References

External links
 San Francisco Conservatory of Music Library & Archives, Oral History Project, page on Conrad Susa

1935 births
2013 deaths
20th-century American composers
20th-century American male musicians
20th-century classical composers
20th-century American LGBT people
21st-century American composers
21st-century American male musicians
21st-century classical composers
21st-century American LGBT people
American classical composers
American male classical composers
American opera composers
Classical musicians from California
LGBT classical composers
Male opera composers
People from Springdale, Pennsylvania
Pupils of Vincent Persichetti
Pupils of William Bergsma
San Francisco Conservatory of Music faculty